Olavi Linnonmaa (30 May 1920 – 25 May 1995) was a Finnish cyclist. He competed in the men's tandem event at the 1952 Summer Olympics.

References

External links
 

1920 births
1995 deaths
Finnish male cyclists
Olympic cyclists of Finland
Cyclists at the 1952 Summer Olympics
Sportspeople from Helsinki